The 1992 WCHA Men's Ice Hockey Tournament was the 33rd conference playoff in league history and 40th season where a WCHA champion was crowned. The tournament was played between March 13 and March 21, 1992. First round games were played at home team campus sites while all 'Final Four' matches were held at the Civic Center in St. Paul, Minnesota. By winning the tournament, Northern Michigan was awarded the Broadmoor Trophy and received the WCHA's automatic bid to the 1992 NCAA Division I Men's Ice Hockey Tournament.

Format
The first round of the postseason tournament featured a best-of-three games format. The team that finished ninth in the conference was not eligible for tournament play.  Teams were seeded No. 1 through No. 8 according to their final conference standing, with a tiebreaker system used to seed teams with an identical number of points accumulated. The top four seeded teams each earned home ice and hosted one of the lower seeded teams.

The winners of the first round series advanced to the semifinal and championship rounds held at the Civic Center. All Final Four games used a single-elimination format. Teams were re-seeded No. 1 through No. 4 according to the final regular season conference standings, with the top remaining seed matched against lowest remaining seed in one semifinal game while the two other semifinalists meeting with the winners advancing to the championship game and the losers competing in a Third Place contest. The Tournament Champion received an automatic bid to the 1992 NCAA Division I Men's Ice Hockey Tournament.

Conference standings
Note: GP = Games Played; W = Wins; L = Losses; T = Ties; PTS = Points; GF = Goals For; GA = Goals Against

Bracket
Teams are reseeded after the first round

Note: * denotes overtime period(s)

Quarterfinals

(1) Minnesota vs. (8) North Dakota

(2) Wisconsin vs. (7) St. Cloud State

(3) Northern Michigan vs. (6) Michigan Tech

(4) Colorado College vs. (5) Minnesota-Duluth

Semifinals

(1) Minnesota vs. (4) Colorado College

(2) Wisconsin vs. (3) Northern Michigan

Third Place

(2) Wisconsin vs. (4) Colorado College

Championship

(1) Minnesota vs. (3) Northern Michigan

Tournament awards

All-Tournament Team
F Craig Johnson (Minnesota)
F Dan Plante (Wisconsin)
F Tony Szabo (Northern Michigan)
D Chris Hynnes (Colorado College)
D Doug Zmolek (Minnesota)
G Corwin Saurdiff* (Northern Michigan)
* Most Valuable Player(s)

See also
Western Collegiate Hockey Association men's champions

References

External links
WCHA.com
1991–92 WCHA Standings
1991–92 NCAA Standings
2013–14 Colorado College Tigers Media Guide
2013–14 Minnesota Golden Gophers Media Guide 
2012–13 Minnesota-Duluth Bulldogs Media Guide
2013–14 North Dakota Hockey Media Guide
2006–07 Northern Michigan Wildcats Media Guide
2011–12 St. Cloud State Huskies Media Guide
2003–04 Wisconsin Badgers Media Guide

WCHA Men's Ice Hockey Tournament
Wcha Men's Ice Hockey Tournament